The 1989 World Table Tennis Championships – Corbillon Cup (women's team) was the 33rd edition of the women's team championship.

China won the gold medal defeating South Korea in the final 3–0. Hong Kong won the bronze medal.

Medalists

Second stage

Group A

Group B

Group C

Group D

Quarter finals

Semifinals

Third-place playoff

Final

See also
 List of World Table Tennis Championships medalists

References

-
1989 in women's table tennis